Kris Kosach is an American television host and radio personality, producer, and writer. She is best known for her work as one of the first VJs on MTV2 and as a Music Host for TechTV. She has also hosted multiple shows for Travel Channel.

Career
Kosach began her career in radio, working at Alternative Rock stations before being recruited as one of the first VJs to launch the all-music network MTV2, then known simply as M2. Kosach hosted daily sample blocks of M2's eclectic playlists on parent network MTV and was the face of Viacom's first Live Stream. 

Following MTV, Kosach Hosted the music technology series AudioFile for TechTV. The show was shot on location in music locales around the globe and throughout the United States. AudioFile covered all aspects of music production from artist releases to creation to distribution. The show included a music news segment and was ground-breaking for its coverage of industry issues such as music piracy, and events including the first stream of the Grammy Awards. The series followed the evolution of the music industry through the digital age, earning it an Emmy Award. 

Owing to her background in radio, Kosach repurposed AudioFile's artist interviews to create a stand-alone audio series called "AudioFile AirWav". The program was intended for radio syndication, but at the dawn of the iTunes platform, it was instead uploaded there. Today, "AudioFile AirWav" is regarded as one of the first music podcasts. Before leaving TechTV, Kosach was named the network's Entertainment Reporter where she contributed stories to ABC News and CNN. 

In 2004, Kosach hosted Travel Gear for Travel Channel where she reviewed recreational gear and consumer electronics while participating in extreme sports: skydiving, caving, and flying fighter jets among others. Concurrently, Kosach created the first blog for Discovery. In 2016 Kosach returned to her roots presenting music at radio stations while also producing podcasts. She currently lives with her family in Los Angeles.

Personal life
Kosach is married to television executive Alex Wellen.

References

External links
Official website

Living people
American women television personalities
American radio personalities
American women writers
20th-century American women
21st-century American women
20th-century American writers
21st-century American writers
Date of birth missing (living people)
Year of birth missing (living people)
Place of birth missing (living people)